Lycée Blaise Pascal or Lycée Français Blaise Pascal (LFBP) may refer to:
 Lycée Français Blaise Pascal Abidjan - Abidjan, Ivory Coast
 Lycée Blaise Pascal de Libreville - Libreville, Gabon
 The high school division of the École Pascal (FR) in Paris
 Lycée Blaise-Pascal (Orsay)
 Lycée Blaise-Pascal (Charbonnières-les-Bains)
 Lycée Blaise-Pascal (Châteauroux)
 Lycée Blaise-Pascal (FR) (Clermont-Ferrand)
 Lycée Blaise-Pascal (Colmar)
 Lycée Blaise-Pascal (Brie-Comte-Robert)
 Lycée Blaise-Pascal (Rouen)
 Lycée Blaise-Pascal (Longuenesse)